Saigon is a novel by Anthony Grey. Saigon follows the lives of three families, one American, one French, and the other Vietnamese, from the French colonial era in the early 1920s until the last helicopter left Saigon at the end of the Vietnam War.

The novel was published in 1982 by Weidenfeld & Nicolson in London and Little, Brown in Boston.

References

Novels set during the Vietnam War
1982 novels
Novels set in Vietnam
Novels set in Saigon
Little, Brown and Company books